This article details the Catalans Dragons rugby league football club's 2007 season. This is their 2nd season in the Super League.

Table

Milestones

Round 1: Clint Greenshields, Adam Mogg, Vincent Duport, Dimitri Pelo, Casey McGuire, Aaron Gorrell, Sébastien Raguin, Jason Croker and David Ferriol made their debuts for the Dragons.
Round 1: Vincent Duport and Adam Mogg scored their 1st try for the Dragons.
Round 1: Aaron Gorrell kicked his 1st goal for the Dragons.
Round 3: Casey McGuire and Dimitri Pelo scored their 1st try for the Dragons.
Round 5: Jason Croker scored his 1st try for the Dragons.
Round 6: Clint Greenshields scored his 1st try for the Dragons.
Round 6: Stacey Jones kicked his 1st drop-goal for the Dragons.
Round 7: Luke Quigley made his debut for the Dragons.
Round 7: David Ferriol scored his 1st try for the Dragons.
Round 7: Jason Croker kicked his 1st drop-goal for the Dragons.
CCR4: Andrew Bentley and Kane Bentley made their debut for the Dragons.
CCR4: Cyrille Gossard, Andrew Bentley and Younes Khattabi scored their 1st try for the Dragons.
Round 8: Kane Bentley scored his 1st try for the Dragons.
Round 8: Thomas Bosc reached 100 points for the Dragons.
Round 10: Julien Touxagas scored his 1st try for the Dragons.
Round 11: Olivier Charles made his debut for the Dragons.
Round 11: Olivier Charles scored his 1st try for the Dragons.
Round 14: Justin Murphy scored his 2nd hat-trick for the Dragons.
CCQF: Thomas Bosc and Jérôme Guisset kicked their 1st drop-goal for the Dragons.
Round 18: Jérôme Guisset made his 50th appearance for the Dragons.
Round 19: Sébastien Raguin scored his 1st try for the Dragons.
Round 19: Thomas Bosc reached 200 points for the Dragons.
Round 20: Alex Chan made his 50th appearance for the Dragons.
Round 21: Luke Quigley scored his 1st try for the Dragons.
CCSF: Stacey Jones reached 100 points for the Dragons.
Round 23: John Wilson made his 50th appearance for the Dragons.
Round 26: Cyril Stacul made his debut for the Dragons.
Round 26: Grégory Mounis made his 50th appearance for the Dragons.
Round 27: Cyril Stacul scored his 1st try for the Dragons.

Fixtures and results

2007 Super League

Player appearances
Super League only

 = Injured

 = Suspended

Challenge Cup

Player appearances
Challenge Cup games only

Squad statistics

 Appearances and Points include (Super League, Challenge Cup and Play-offs) as of 15 September 2007.

Transfers

In

Out

References

2007 in rugby league by club
2007 in English rugby league
Catalans Dragons seasons